Gary Boucher (born 3 November 1953) is a South African former cricketer. He played in twenty-five first-class and six List A matches for Border from 1976/77 to 1981/82.

See also
 List of Border representative cricketers

References

External links
 

1953 births
Living people
South African cricketers
Border cricketers
Sportspeople from Qonce